Clifford "Cliff" Toney (born December 17, 1958) is a former American football defensive back who played five seasons with the Edmonton Eskimos of the Canadian Football League. He was drafted by the Atlanta Falcons in the eighth round of the 1981 NFL Draft. He played college football at Auburn University.

References

External links
Just Sports Stats
Cliff Toney trading card

Living people
1958 births
Players of American football from Alabama
American football defensive backs
Canadian football defensive backs
African-American players of American football
African-American players of Canadian football
Auburn Tigers football players
Edmonton Elks players
Sportspeople from Huntsville, Alabama
21st-century African-American people
20th-century African-American sportspeople